The 1968 Texas Longhorns football team represented the University of Texas at Austin during the 1968 NCAA University Division football season.

Schedule

Roster

Awards and honors
James Street, quarterback, Cotton Bowl co-Most Valuable Player
Cotton Speyrer, wide receiver, Cotton Bowl co-Most Valuable Player
Tom Campbell, linebacker, Cotton Bowl co-Most Valuable Player
Chris Gilbert, back, Consensus All-American

References

Texas
Southwest Conference football champion seasons
Texas Longhorns football seasons
Cotton Bowl Classic champion seasons
Texas Longhorns football